Richart Martín Báez Fernández (born 31 July 1973) is a Paraguayan former footballer who played as a striker.

Career
Baez can be considered one of the most notable strikers in Olimpia's history. In 2002, he helped Olimpia conquer the Copa Libertadores de América scoring a crucial goal in the final. His best attribute was the scoring goals from crossing balls with his head. Baez was also known for having great charisma with the supporters and with the team. He represented Paraguay at the 2002 FIFA World Cup.

After he retired from playing, Báez became a football manager. He led Club Martín Ledesma during the 2006 season.

Club statistics

National team statistics

Honours

Club
Universidad de Chile
 Primera División Chilena'': Top Scorer 1997 Clausura (10 goals)

References

External links

 

1973 births
Sportspeople from Asunción
Avispa Fukuoka players
Club América footballers
Club Olimpia footballers
Atlético Celaya footballers
Paraguay international footballers
1995 Copa América players
2002 FIFA World Cup players
Living people
J1 League players
Liga MX players
Chilean Primera División players
Paraguayan Primera División players
Paraguayan footballers
Paraguayan expatriate footballers
Expatriate footballers in Japan
Expatriate footballers in Guatemala
Expatriate footballers in Mexico
Expatriate footballers in Chile
Paraguayan expatriate sportspeople in Chile
Universidad de Chile footballers
Association football forwards
Deportivo Capiatá managers